Lipocosma albinibasalis is a moth in the family Crambidae. It is found in North America, where it has been recorded from Arizona, California and Baja California.

The length of the forewings is 7–8 mm. Adults are on wing from June to September.

References

Moths described in 1995
Glaphyriinae